The 2017 Gold Coast Titans season was the 11th in the club's history. The Titans competed in the National Rugby League's 2017 Telstra Premiership. They also competed in the 2017 NRL Auckland Nines pre-season tournament.

Season summary

Milestones
Round 1: Joe Greenwood, Kevin Proctor, Jarrod Wallace and Dan Sarginson made their debut for the club.
Round 2: Tyronne Roberts-Davis made his first grade debut.
Round 3: Tyler Cornish and Max King made their first grade debut.
Round 4: Dale Copley and Daniel Vidot made their debut for the club.
Round 5: Chris Grevsmuhl made his debut for the club. 
Round 5: The club played their 250th game in the NRL.
Round 6: Morgan Boyle made his first grade debut. Paterika Vaivai made his debut for the club.
Round 15: Phillip Sami made his first grade debut. Pat Politoni made his debut for the club.
Round 16: Jamal Fogarty made his first grade debut.
Round 24: Ben Nakubuwai made his first grade debut.
Round 26: Keegan Hipgrave made his first grade debut.

Ladder

Fixtures

Pre-season

NRL Auckland Nines

NRL Auckland Nines Finals

Regular season

References

2017 season summary

Gold Coast Titans seasons
Gold Coast Titans season